Branzi is a comune (municipality) in the Province of Bergamo in the Italian region of Lombardy, located about  northeast of Milan and about  north of Bergamo.

Branzi borders the following municipalities: Ardesio, Carona, Isola di Fondra, Piazzatorre, Roncobello, Valgoglio, Valleve.

References